

Hans-Heinrich Jescheck (10 January 1915 – 27 September 2009) was German professor of law at the University of Freiburg (1954–1980). He was also director of the Max Planck Institute for Foreign and International Criminal Law in Freiburg (until 1982). He was rector of the University of Freiburg from 1964 to 1965.

In Nazi Germany, he was an officer in the Wehrmacht during World War II and a recipient of the Knight's Cross of the Iron Cross.

Awards 
 Knight's Cross of the Iron Cross on 5 March 1945 as Hauptmann of the Reserves and leader of Panzer-Aufklärungs-Abteilung 118

References

 

1915 births
2009 deaths
People from Legnica
People from the Province of Silesia
Recipients of the Gold German Cross
Recipients of the Knight's Cross of the Iron Cross
German prisoners of war in World War II held by France
Jurists from Baden-Württemberg
Academic staff of the University of Freiburg
German Army officers of World War II
Max Planck Institute directors